European Parliament Report is an Irish television programme broadcast on RTÉ One and RTÉ News Now. It is produced by RTÉ News and Current Affairs and airs weekly on Sunday nights at around midnight usually after The Week in Politics. It features reports of recent happenings from the European Parliament in Strasbourg. It is filmed from inside the European Parliament buildings and usually features a panel of guests discussing the recent proceedings in parliament. The programme is presented by Edel McAllister.

Irish television news shows
RTÉ News and Current Affairs
RTÉ original programming
Politics of the European Union